The Sleeping Hermaphroditus is an ancient marble sculpture depicting Hermaphroditus life size.  In 1620, Italian artist Gian Lorenzo Bernini sculpted the mattress upon which the statue now lies. The form is partly derived from ancient portrayals of Venus and other female nudes, and partly from contemporaneous feminised Hellenistic portrayals of Dionysus/Bacchus. It represents a subject that was much repeated in Hellenistic times and in ancient Rome, to judge from the number of versions that have survived. Discovered at Santa Maria della Vittoria, Rome, the Sleeping Hermaphroditus was immediately claimed by Cardinal Scipione Borghese and became part of the Borghese Collection. The "Borghese Hermaphroditus" was later sold to the occupying French and was moved to The Louvre, where it is on display.

The Sleeping Hermaphroditus has been described as a good early Imperial Roman copy of a bronze original by the later of the two Hellenistic sculptors named Polycles (working c. 155 BC); the original bronze was mentioned in Pliny's Natural History.

Original Borghese copy

The ancient sculpture was discovered in the first decades of the seventeenth century—unearthed in the grounds of Santa Maria della Vittoria, near the Baths of Diocletian and within the bounds of the ancient Gardens of Sallust. The discovery was made either when the church foundations were being dug (in 1608) or when espaliers were being planted.

The sculpture was presented to the connoisseur Cardinal Scipione Borghese, who in return granted the order the services of his architect Giovanni Battista Soria and paid for the façade of the church, albeit sixteen years later. In his new Villa Borghese, a room called the Room of the Hermaphrodite was devoted to it.

In 1620, Gian Lorenzo Bernini, Scipione's protégé, was paid sixty scudi for making the buttoned mattress upon which the Hermaphroditus reclines, so strikingly realistic that visitors are inclined to give it a testing prod.

The Sleeping Hermaphroditus and many other sculptures were purchased in 1807 from prince Camillo Borghese, owner of the Borghese Collection, who had married Pauline Bonaparte. It was transferred to The Louvre, where it inspired Algernon Charles Swinburne's poem "Hermaphroditus" in 1863.

Ancient copies
A second-century copy of the Sleeping Hermaphroditus was found in 1781, and has taken the original's place at the Galleria Borghese. A third Roman marble variant was discovered in 1880, during building works to make Rome the capital of a newly united Italy. It is now on display at the Museo Palazzo Massimo Alle Terme, part of the National Museum of Rome.

Additional ancient copies can be found at the Uffizi in Florence, Vatican Museums in Vatican City, and the Hermitage Museum in St Petersburg.

Modern copies

Many copies have been produced since the Renaissance, in a variety of media and scales. Full size copies were produced for Philip IV of Spain in bronze, ordered by Velázquez and now in the Prado Museum, and for Versailles (by the sculptor , in marble). The composition has clearly influenced Velázquez's painting of the Rokeby Venus, now in London. A reduced-scale bronze copy, made and signed by Giovanni Francesco Susini, is now at the Metropolitan Museum. Another reduced-scale copy, this time produced in ivory by François Duquesnoy, was purchased in Rome by John Evelyn in the 1640s. American artist Barry X Ball produced a life-size copy after the Louvre's version, made from Belgian black marble on a Carrara marble base, which was completed in 2010.
This sculpture was offered for sale at Christies, New York, on 10 May 2016. The estimated price was $500,000–800,000.

See also
List of works by Gian Lorenzo Bernini

References

Notes

Bibliography

 Haskell, Francis and Nicholas Penny (1981). Taste and the Antique: The Lure of Classical Sculpture, 1600-1900. New Haven: Yale University Press.
 
 
 
 
 Robertson, Martin (1975).A History of Greek Art, vol. I:551-52, New York: Cambridge University Press.

External links

 Sleeping Hermaphroditos | Louvre Museum -  Statue information
 The first copy, Louvre catalogue page 
 Hermaphrodites at the Villa Borghese

Borghese antiquities
Antiquities acquired by Napoleon
Hellenistic-style Roman sculptures
Archaeological discoveries in Italy
Sculptures by Gian Lorenzo Bernini
Marble sculptures